This is a list of television production companies, sorted by country.

Australia

Egypt
 Studio Misr
 Lotus Film Production
 Ramses Naguib
 Salah Zulfikar Films
 Mary Queeny Films
 Egyptian Media Production City
 Dollar Film
 New Century Production

France 

Luminar Productions

India 
 Balaji Telefilms
Gahlaut Entertainment Private Limited
Movement Creations LLP
 Prag News
Rashmi Sharma Telefilms
Triangle Film Company
 StarPlus
 Sun Pictures
Magic Moments Motion Pictures
Vaishnavi Production House
 Essel Group

Netherlands 

 Endemol Shine Group
 Endemol

New Zealand

Thailand 

BEC-TERO
GMMTV
GMM Bravo
JSL Global Media
Kantana Group
TV Thunder
Workpoint Entertainment
ZENSE Entertainment

United Kingdom

 Warner Bros. Television Productions UK
 AJK TV
 Aardman Animations
 BBC Studios
 BBC Television
 Bigg Boss international
 Broken Flames Productions
 Candid Broads Productions
 Fremantle
 HIT Entertainment 
 ITV Studios
 Ragdoll Productions
 Talkback (established 1981)
 Tiger Aspect Productions

United States

Major
 Warner Bros. Discovery
 Warner Bros. Television Studios
 Home Box Office, Inc.
 CNN
 Walt Disney Television
 20th Television
 ABC Signature
 Fox Corporation
 Fox Entertainment
 NBCUniversal Television and Streaming
 Universal Television
 Paramount Global
 Paramount Television Studios
 CBS Studios
 Sony
 Sony Pictures Television

See also 

 List of film production companies

References

Television
Production companies